Mount Sapun or Sapun Ridge is a 240 m high ridge to the southeast of Sevastopol, situated on the disputed Crimean peninsula.

It became the site of heavy fighting during the siege of Sevastopol (1941-1942), and also during its liberation in 1944.

When defending Sevastopol the Soviet troops held the Sapun Ridge and could observe German movements to the city from the south.
It took Wehrmacht nearly 2 weeks of desperate fighting to take control over these positions in late June 1942. As a consequence, Soviet troops had to evacuate from Crimea.

In 2 years, on the final stage of the Crimean Offensive the assault of Sapun-gora on 7 May 1944 was successful for Red Army. On 9 May 1944, just over one month after the start of the battle, Sevastopol fell. German forces were evacuated from Sevastopol to Constanța.

Later in 1944 the first monuments to the Soviet warriors on this place were erected, in 1959 the diorama showing the assault of the German fortifications was opened.

External links
 The Monuments of Sevastopol

Eastern Front (World War II)
Battles and operations of the Soviet–German War
History of Crimea
Crimea in World War II
World War II memorials in Ukraine
Landforms of Crimea
Hills of Ukraine
Landforms of Sevastopol
World War II sites in Ukraine
Ridges of Russia
Ridges of Europe
Cultural heritage monuments in Sevastopol
Objects of cultural heritage of Russia of federal significance